Niklas Stolze (born December 28, 1992) is a German mixed martial artist who competes in the Lightweight division.  A professional since 2014, he most notably competed for the Ultimate Fighting Championship (UFC).

Background
Stolze began his career in Combat Jiu-Jitsu at the age of 15, then switched to kickboxing two years later through his coach Sascha Poppendieck. But the goal was always MMA, deciding in 2014 to pursue a career as an MMA professional. On top of MMA, Stolze also completed training as a welder.

He is the first East German to be signed to the UFC.

Mixed martial arts career

Early career
Stolze spent most of his pre-UFC career fighting on the European regional scene, compiling a 12–3 record, with two of his losses coming the way of unanimous decision at BAMMA, losing to Terry Brazier at BAMMA 27 and Chris Stringer at BAMMA 30.

Ultimate Fighting Championship
Stolze made his UFC debut, as a replacement for  Shavkat Rakhmonov, against Ramazan Emeev on July 26, 2020 at UFC on ESPN: Whittaker vs. Till. Stolze lost the fight via unanimous decision.

Stolze was scheduled to face Mounir Lazzez on July 31, 2021 at UFC on ESPN: Hall vs. Strickland. However, Lazzez pulled out just a few days before the event due to visa issues and was replaced by Jared Gooden.
 He lost the fight via knockout in round one.

Stolze faced Benoît Saint-Denis on June 4, 2022 at UFC Fight Night: Volkov vs. Rozenstruik. Stolze lost the bout after getting submitted in the second round.

On June 9, 2022 it was announced that Stolze was released from the UFC.

Mixed martial arts record

|-
|Loss
|align=center|12–6
|Benoît Saint-Denis
|Submission (rear-naked choke) 
|UFC Fight Night: Volkov vs. Rozenstruik
|
|align=center|2
|align=center|1:32
|Las Vegas, Nevada, United States
|
|-
|Loss
|align=center|12–5
|Jared Gooden
|KO (punch)
|UFC on ESPN: Hall vs. Strickland
|
|align=center|1
|align=center|1:08
|Las Vegas, Nevada, United States
|
|-
|Loss
|align=center|12–4
|Ramazan Emeev
|Decision (unanimous)
|UFC on ESPN: Whittaker vs. Till 
|
|align=center|3
|align=center|5:00
|Abu Dhabi, United Arab Emirates
|
|-
|Win
|align=center|12–3
|Omar Jesus Santana
|Decision (unanimous)
|Nova FC 1
|
|align=center|3
|align=center|5:00
|Balingen, Germany
|
|-
|Win
|align=center|11–3
|Christian Draxler
|TKO (punches)
|Cage FS 9
|
|align=center|1
|align=center|3:43
|Graz, Austria
|
|-
|Win
|align=center|10–3
|Jan Janka
|Submission (rear-naked choke)
|Oktagon 7
|
|align=center|2
|align=center|3:32
|Prague, Czech Republic
|
|-
|Win
|align=center|9–3
|Johannes Michalik
|Submission (rear-naked choke)
|Hype FC 8
|
|align=center|1
|align=center|2:47
|Bremen, Germany
|
|-
|Loss
|align=center|8–3
|Chris Stringer
|Decision (unanimous)
|BAMMA 30
|
|align=center|3
|align=center|5:00
|Dublin, Ireland
|  
|-
|Win
|align=center|8–2
|Mahmod Faour
|Decision (unanimous)
|Magdeburger Cage 1
|
|align=center|3
|align=center|5:00
|Magdeburg, Germany
|
|-
|Loss
|align=center|7–2
|Terry Brazier
|Decision (unanimous)
|BAMMA 27
|
|align=center|3
|align=center|5:00
|Dublin, Ireland
|
|-
|Win
|align=center|7–1
|Maxime Vanelstraete
|Submission (rear-naked choke)
|Imperium Fighting Championship 5
|
|align=center|2
|align=center|3:25
|Leipzig, Germany
|
|-
|Win
|align=center|6–1
|Johannes Grebe
|Submission (armbar)
|Superior FC 14
|
|align=center|1
|align=center|2:32
|Düren, Germany
|
|-
|Win
|align=center|5–1
|Rastislav Hanulay
|Decision (unanimous)
|Imperium Fighting Championship 4
|
|align=center|2
|align=center|5:00
|Leipzig, Germany
|
|-
|Win
|align=center|4–1
|Florent Conte
|TKO (punches)
|Imperium Fighting Championship 3
|
|align=center|2
|align=center|4:39
|Leipzig, Germany
| 
|-
|Loss
|align=center|3–1
|Sebastian Reimitz
|Decision (split)
|Ravage: Finest MMA
|
|align=center|3
|align=center|5:00
|Hamburg, Germany
|
|-
|Win
|align=center|3–0
|Max Rose
|KO (head kick)
|Imperium Fighting Championship 2
|
|align=center|1
|align=center|1:28
|Leipzig, Germany
|
|-
|Win
|align=center|2–0
|Nils Fischer
|Submission (guillotine choke)
|La Onda Fight Club
|
|align=center|1
|align=center|0:50
|Magdeburg, Germany
|
|-
|Win
|align=center|1–0
|Lauris Leitans
|TKO (punches)
|Imperium Fighting Championship
|
|align=center|1
|align=center|1:48
|Leipzig, Germany
|

See also 
 List of male mixed martial artists

References

External links 
  
  

1992 births
Living people
German male mixed martial artists
Lightweight mixed martial artists
Mixed martial artists utilizing kickboxing
Mixed martial artists utilizing jujutsu
Ultimate Fighting Championship male fighters
German jujutsuka